FE8 may refer to:

Video games
 Fire Emblem: The Sacred Stones, the eighth game in the Fire Emblem series.

Aircraft
 Royal Aircraft Factory F.E.8, biplane made during the first World War.